Stanislav Kotyo (born 6 April 1994 in Zakarpattia Oblast, Ukraine) is a Ukrainian football defender who played for FC Hoverla Uzhhorod in the Ukrainian Premier League.

Kotyo is a product of the Uzhhorod Youth Sportive School System. In 2013, he signed a contract with FC Hoverla, but played only in the FC Hoverla Uzhhorod reserves. In the main-team squad Kotyo made his debut playing as a substitute in the match against FC Volyn Lutsk on 14 May 2016 in the Ukrainian Premier League.

He is a son of the retired Ukrainian footballer Ivan Kotyo, who played for FC Zakarpattia Uzhhorod in the middle 1990s.

References

External links 
 
 

Ukrainian footballers
Association football defenders
1994 births
Living people
FC Hoverla Uzhhorod players
FC Uzhhorod players
Ukrainian Premier League players
Ukrainian Second League players